Nationality words link to articles with information on the nation's poetry or literature (for instance, Irish or France).

Events

Works published
 Richard Brathwaite, The Fatall Nuptiall; or, Mournefull Marriage, anonymously published
 John Saltmarsh, Poemata sacra
 Wye Saltonstall, Ovids Heroicall Epistles, translated from the Latin of Ovid's 
 Longinus, On the Sublime, an edition (not in English) by Gerard Langbaine at Oxford; a widely known edition; Ancient Greek criticism; twice reprinted before 1551 (see John Hall's translation, the first into English, 1652; and Nicolas Boileau-Despréaux's influential translation into French in 1674)

Births
Death years link to the corresponding "[year] in poetry" article:
 January 1 – Jacques Cassagne (died 1679), French clergyman, poet and moralist
 April 7 – Gregório de Matos, (died 1696), Brazilian Baroque poet
 November 1 – Nicolas Boileau-Despréaux (died 1711), French poet and critic
 Also:
 Jean de Montigny (died 1671), French poet and philosopher
 Thomas Traherne, born this year or in 1637 (died 1674), English poet and religious writer

Deaths
Birth years link to the corresponding "[year] in poetry" article:
 January 19 – Daniel Schwenter (born 1585), German Orientalist, mathematician, inventor, poet and librarian
 August 25 – Bhai Gurdas (born 1551), Punjabi Sikh scholar, poet and scribe of the Adi Granth

See also

 Poetry
 17th century in poetry
 17th century in literature

Notes

17th-century poetry
Poetry